Adam A. Goode (born September 9, 1983) is an American politician from Maine. Goode, a Democrat, was elected to the Maine House of Representatives from Bangor's District 15 in November 2008 and re-elected in 2010, 2012 and 2014. Goode is the former chair of the Taxation Committee, is a member of the Insurance and Financial Services Committee, and is also the Head Boys and Girls Cross Country Coach at Bangor High School, his alma mater. He is also pursuing a master's degree in Social Work from the University of Maine. He previously worked as an Environmental Organizer with the Maine People's Alliance and Maine People's Resource Center.

References

1983 births
Living people
Politicians from Calais, Maine
Politicians from Bangor, Maine
University of Maine alumni
Democratic Party members of the Maine House of Representatives
21st-century American politicians